National Secondary Route 244, or just Route 244 (or ) is a National Road Route of Costa Rica, located in the San José province.

Description
In San José province the route covers Pérez Zeledón canton (Daniel Flores, Platanares, Pejibaye districts).

References

Highways in Costa Rica